Aue is a Samtgemeinde ("collective municipality") in the district of Uelzen, in Lower Saxony, Germany. Its seat is in the village Wrestedt. It was formed on 1 November 2011 by the merger of the former Samtgemeinden Wrestedt and Bodenteich.

The Samtgemeinde Aue consists of the following municipalities:

 Bad Bodenteich
 Lüder 
 Soltendieck
 Wrestedt

Samtgemeinden in Lower Saxony
Uelzen (district)